Henrique da Silva Gomes (born August 20, 1982 in Rio de Janeiro), known as Henrique, is a Brazilian professional football player. Currently, he plays in the Luxembourg National Division for RFCU Luxembourg.

He played on the professional level in Ligue 2 for Stade Reims.

References

External links

1982 births
Living people
Brazilian footballers
Brazilian expatriate footballers
Expatriate footballers in Belgium
Expatriate footballers in France
Expatriate footballers in Luxembourg
Brazilian expatriate sportspeople in Belgium
Brazilian expatriate sportspeople in France
Brazilian expatriate sportspeople in Luxembourg
Ligue 2 players
Stade de Reims players
FC Rouen players
CSO Amnéville players
Racing Besançon players
Association football defenders
Footballers from Rio de Janeiro (city)